Jeff LeBlanc (born February 9, 1986) is an independent American singer and songwriter. He was born and raised in Center Moriches, New York, before attending Sacred Heart University in Fairfield, Connecticut, where he studied history, music history and education.

Career
Jeff began performing sometime in 2004, getting his start as a street busker in Westhampton, NY during the summer months outside of the Beach Bakery Cafe.  In early 2006, LeBlanc released his first four track demo entitled "Stories From a Small Town". The album comprised songs he wrote and recorded in his Sacred Heart University dormitory room. In late 2006, he began touring colleges and venues at weekends while he continued to complete his degree. In 2008, LeBlanc was voted to showcase "on site" at the National Association for Campus Activities Northeast Conference by over 850 college talent buyers in Hartford, Connecticut. He achieved this feat again in October 2009 at the Mid-Atlantic Conference in Lancaster, Pennsylvania. These showcases helped him to a headlining tour of colleges and universities throughout the east coast and springboard him on to the national circuit.

Jeff's first studio release, "Signals", came in the summer of 2009.  Recorded in Nashville, the album featured the song "Until We Get It Right", which entered the rotation of Sirius XM's Coffee House.

Following two years of extensive touring and writing, Jeff returned to Nashville for his sophomore effort, "Worth Holding On To".  The album debuted in the Top 10 of the iTunes Singer/Songwriter Top 200, reaching #3.  The album produced another successful single, "Happier", which was also featured in heavy rotation on SiriusXM's The Coffee House.  The extensive airplay led Jeff to be nominated for their Singer/Songwriter Discovery of the Year.  Jeff's music has been extensively placed on television programs including I Am Cait, Teen Mom, The Real World, The Challenge Rivals, Keeping Up with the Kardashians', FriendZone and Jersey Shore''.

Jeff released his third studio effort, "My Own Way There", in July 2013.  The album once again reached the Top 10 of the iTunes Singer/Songwriter Top 200.

LeBlanc's latest album, "Vision", was released in May 2015.  It reached the Top 20 of the iTunes Singer/Songwriter Top 200 and received solid reviews from critics.  "His voice is pure silken gold" said AXS writer Allen Foster.  "It’s very easy to like everything about Jeff LeBlanc – the perfect album for the season, to be sure." – PopDose In September 2015, Jeff performed a special "Coffee House Live" on SiriusXM's Coffee House.  His song "Lost Tonight" and his cover of "Fly Me To The Moon" are now in rotation on the channel.

He opened for Boz Skaggs on his 2021 tour.

References

1986 births
Living people
American singer-songwriters
American male singer-songwriters
Sacred Heart University alumni
People from Center Moriches, New York
21st-century American singers
21st-century American male singers